Four Towns or Four Town may refer to:

Four Towns, Michigan
Four Town Lake, a lake in Minnesota